Fastigiella is a genus of sea snails, marine gastropod mollusks in the family Cerithiidae.

Species
Species within the genus Fastigiella include:

 Fastigiella carinata Reeve, 1848

References

Cerithiidae
Monotypic gastropod genera